Alpenus nigropunctatus is a moth of the family Erebidae. It was described by George Thomas Bethune-Baker in 1908. It is found in Ghana, Nigeria, Sudan, Somalia, Ethiopia, Kenya and Uganda.

The larvae feed on Gossypium species.

References

Moths described in 1908
Spilosomina
Moths of Africa